François Lalonde (born 17 September 1955 in Montréal) is a Canadian mathematician, specializing in symplectic geometry and symplectic topology.

Lalonde received from the Université de Montréal in 1976, at the age of 20, his bachelor's degree (called licence in France) in physics and, after a year to complete the bachelor in mathematics in 1977, he received in 1979 his master's degree in logic and theoretical computer science (complexity theory and NP-completeness). In  1985 he received his doctorate (Doctorat d'Etat) in mathematics from the Université de Paris-Saclay in Orsay becoming one of the rare candidates obtaining the Doctorat d'Etat before the age of thirty. He then was an NSERC (Natural Sciences and Engineering Research Council of Canada) University Research Fellow at Université du Québec à Montréal where he became, six years later, full professor in 1991 until 2000. He is professor at the Université de Montréal since 2000, holding from 2001 to 2022 the Canada Research Chair (CRC) in differential geometry and topology when the CRC program was first set up by the Prime Minister of Canada.

He has held invited positions at many institutions, including the IHES (1983–1985), Harvard University (1989–1990), the Université de Strasbourg (1990), the University of Tel Aviv (1997 and 1999), the École Polytechnique (2001-2002), Stanford University (2005 and 2022), the École Normale Supérieure de Lyon (2008), and the Université d'Aix-Marseille (2015).

With Octav Cornea he developed a new homology (cluster homology), leading to a new universal Floer homology for pairs of Lagrangian submanifolds of a symplectic manifold. He has also collaborated with Dusa McDuff and Leonid Polterovich.

He became Fellow of the Royal Society of Canada in 1997 at the age of 41,  Fellow of the Fields Institute in 2001 when this distinction was introduced. From 2000 to 2002 he was a Killam Fellow, a private-public foundation in arts and sciences that enables Canadian researchers to devote most of their time to their works.

From 2004 to 2008 and from 2011 to 2013 he was the director of the Centre de Recherches Mathématiques (CRM), the premier scientific institute in Canada founded in 1968, based at Université de Montréal. Members of this institute have won the "Nobel Prize" in computer sciences (Turing Prize, Yoshua Bengio) in 2019 and the Wolf Prize in physics in 2018 (Gilles Brassard), considered as the most prestigious prize in physics after the Nobel, leading usually to the Nobel prize in physics. In 2022, James Maynard (Oxford) was awarded the Fields Medal after his postdoctoral year in the CRM-ISM postdoctoral program that Lalonde founded. 

He (co)founded several institutions, namely the Institut des Sciences Mathématiques (ISM) (McGill, Montréal, UQAM, Concordia, Laval, Sherbrooke universities) based at UQAM, the first unified doctoral school in the world with 250 professors, the Centre interuniversitaire de recherches en géométrie différentielle et en topologie (CIRGET), the Institut transdisciplinaire de recherches en informatique quantique (INTRIQ) with Gilles Brassard and Michael Hilke, the Unité mixte internationale (UMI), a joint venture between the CNRS (France) and the Centre de recherches mathématiques (CRM), and the journal Annales mathématiques du Québec (Springer).

In 2005 and in 2022, he was the Stanford Distinguished Lecturer. He was the Andreas Floer Memorial Lecturer (UC Berkeley) in 2005. In 2006 he was an Invited Speaker with talk Lagrangian submanifolds: from the local model to the cluster complex at the International Congress of Mathematicians (ICM) in Madrid.

Selected publications
with Octav Cornea: Cluster homology, ArXiv Math.SG/0508345, 56 pages, 2006 
with Dusa McDuff and Leonid Polterovich: Topological rigidity of Hamiltonian loops and quantum homology, Inventiones Mathematicae, vol. 135, 1999, pp. 369–385 
with Leonid Polterovich: Symplectic diffeomorphisms as isometries of Hofer's norm, Topology, vol. 36, 1997, pp. 711-728
with McDuff: The geometry of symplectic energy, Annals of Mathematics, vol. 141, 1995, pp. 349–371
with McDuff: Hofer's -geometry: energy and stability of Hamiltonian flows, Inventiones Mathematicae, vol. 122, 1995, parts 1,2, pp. 1–34, 35–69
with McDuff: J-holomorphic curves and the classification of rational and ruled symplectic 4-manifolds, in C. B. Thomas (ed.) Symplectic and Contact Geometry, Cambridge University Press 1996
with Martin Pinsonnault: The topology of the space of symplectic balls in rational $4$-manifolds, Duke Mathematical Journal, 122, 2004, 347-397.Energy and capacities in symplectic topology, in W.H. Kazoo (ed.) Geometric Topology, Studies in Advanced Mathematics, American Mathematical Society/International Press, vol. 2, 1997, pp. 328–374
with McDuff: Local Non-Squeezing Theorems and Stability, Geometric and Functional Analalysis, vol. 5, 1995, p. 364 (in honour of Gromov)
with Michèle Audin and L. Polterovich: Symplectic rigidity: Lagrangian submanifolds, in M. Audin, J. Lafontaine (eds.), Holomorphic Curves in Symplectic Geometry, Progress in Mathematics, vol. 117, 1995, pp. 271–322
with Shengda Hu: A relative Seidel morphism and the Albers map, Trans. Amer. Math. Soc. 362 (2010), pp. 1135–1168 
with J.-C. Sikorav: Sous-varietes lagrangiennes et lagrangiennes exactes des fibres cotangents, Commentarii Mathematici Helvetici, 66, 1991, 18-33.

as editor:
with Miguel Abreu and  Leonid Polterovich (eds.): New Perspectives and Challenges in Symplectic Field Theory, The CRM Proceedings and Lecture Notes 49, 342 (2009)
with Paul Biran and  O. Cornea (eds.): Morse theoretical methods in symplectic topology and non-linear analysis, Proceedings of the NATO Advanced Study Institute (Montréal, 2004), Kluwer Academic Publishers, Dordrecht (2005)
with Yakov Eliashberg and Boris Khesin (eds.): Symplectic and Contact Topology: Interactions and Perspectives, Proceedings of the workshop on Symplectic topology and higher dimensional Gauge invariants (held at the Fields Institute in March–April 2001), Fields Institute Communications 35, AMS (2003)
as sole editor: Proceedings of the CRM Workshop on Geometry, Topology and Dynamics (Montréal 1995), CRM Proceedings and Lecture Notes 15, AMS (1998)
with Jacques Hurtubise (ed.): Gauge Theory and Symplectic Geometry, Proceedings of the NATO Summer Advanced Institute on Gauge Theory and Symplectic Geometry (Montréal 1995), Kluwer Academic Publishers, Dordrecht (1997) (containing Lalonde's contribution J-curves and symplectic invariants'')

References

External links
Homepage

20th-century Canadian mathematicians
21st-century Canadian mathematicians
Université de Montréal alumni
University of Paris alumni
Academic staff of the Université de Montréal
1955 births
Living people